The paramo seedeater (Catamenia homochroa) is a species of bird in the family Thraupidae.

Distribution and habitat
It is found in Bolivia, Brazil, Colombia, Ecuador, Peru, and Venezuela.  Its natural habitats are subtropical or tropical moist montane forests, subtropical or tropical high-altitude shrubland, and heavily degraded former forest.

References

paramo seedeater
Birds of Venezuela
Birds of the Northern Andes
Páramo fauna
paramo seedeater
paramo seedeater
Taxonomy articles created by Polbot